Family Life is a 2014 autobiographical novel by Akhil Sharma. Set in 1978, it tells the coming-of-age story of an eight-year old Indian boy named Ajay Mishra living with his recently immigrated family in New York City. The story develops around his older brother Birju, who suffers a life-changing accident, and how the family copes with the incident.

This was Sharma's second published novel. It won the 2015 Folio Prize and the 2016 International Dublin Literary Award.

References

2014 American novels
American bildungsromans
Indian-American novels
Immigration in fiction
New York City in fiction
Autobiographical novels
Novels set in New York City
Fiction set in 1978
Novels set in the 1970s
W. W. Norton & Company books